The sol (plural: soles; currency sign: S/) is the currency of Peru; it is subdivided into 100 céntimos ("cents").  The ISO 4217 currency code is PEN.

The sol replaced the Peruvian inti in 1991 and the name is a return to that of Peru's historic currency, as the previous incarnation of sol was in use from 1863 to 1985. Although sol in this usage is derived from the Latin solidus, the word also means "sun" in Spanish. There is thus a continuity with the old Peruvian inti, which was named after Inti, the Sun God of the Incas.

At its introduction in 1991, the currency was officially called nuevo sol ("new sol"), but on November 13, 2015, the Peruvian Congress voted to rename the currency simply sol.

History 
Currencies in use before the current Peruvian sol include:
 The Spanish colonial real from the 16th to 19th centuries, with 8 reales equal to 1 peso.
 The Peruvian real from 1822 to 1863. Initially worth  peso, reales worth  peso were introduced in 1858 in their transition to a decimal currency system.
 The sol or sol de oro from 1863 to 1985, at 1 sol = 10 reales.
 The inti from 1985 to 1991, at 1 inti = 1,000 soles de oro.

Due to the bad state of economy and hyperinflation in the late 1980s, the government was forced to abandon the inti and introduce the sol as the country's new currency.  The new currency was put into use on July 1, 1991, by Law No. 25,295, to replace the inti at a rate of 1 sol to 1,000,000 intis.  Coins denominated in the new unit were introduced on October 1, 1991, and the first banknotes on November 13, 1991.  Since that time, the sol has retained an inflation rate of 1.5%, the lowest ever in either South America or Latin America as a whole. Since the new currency was put into effect, it has managed to maintain an exchange rate between S/2.2 and S/4.13 per US dollar.

Coins 
The current coins were introduced in 1991 in denominations of 1, 5, 10, 20, and 50 céntimos and S/1. The S/2 and S/5 coins were added in 1994. Although one- and five-céntimo coins are officially in circulation, they are very rarely used. For this reason the aluminium one-céntimo coin, introduced in December 2005, was removed from circulation on May 1, 2011. Also, five-céntimos coin was removed from circulation on January 1, 2019.

For cash transactions, retailers must round down to the nearest ten céntimos or up to the nearest five.  Electronic transactions will still be processed in the exact amount.  An aluminium five-céntimo coin was introduced in 2007.  All coins show the coat of arms of Peru surrounded by the text Banco Central de Reserva del Perú ("Central Reserve Bank of Peru") on the obverse; the reverse of each coin shows its denomination.  Included in the designs of the bimetallic S/2 and S/5 coins are the hummingbird and condor figures from the Nazca Lines.

Banknotes
Banknotes for S/10, S/20, S/50, and S/100 were introduced in 1990.  The banknote for S/200 was introduced in August 1995. All notes are of the same size (140 x 65 mm) and contain the portrait of a well-known historic Peruvian on the obverse.

A new series of banknotes was issued starting in 2021, beginning with the S/10 and S/100 notes in July 2021 and followed by the S/20 and S/50 notes in July 2022. A S/200 note is expected to follow at a later date.

See also
 Numismatic series Wealth and Pride of Peru
 Numismatic series Natural Resources of Peru
 Economy of Peru
 Peruvian inti

References

External links
Banknotes and Coins from the Central Bank of Peru
Historical banknotes of Peru 
Currency in Peru 

History of Peru
Sol
Currencies introduced in 1991
Currency symbols